Economic regions of Azerbaijan are 14 regions of the Republic of Azerbaijan characterized by a certain economic and geographical position, territorial and economic unity, the diversity of natural and economic conditions and industrial specialization.

List of the regions 
The territory of Azerbaijan was divided into 10 economic districts prior to 2021. On July 7, 2021, the President of Azerbaijan Ilham Aliyev signed Decree "On the new division of economic regions in the Republic of Azerbaijan", which abolished some of the former regions and created new ones. There are currently 14 economic districts of Azerbaijan.

See also 
 Administrative divisions of Azerbaijan

References

External links 
 Economic map of Azerbaijan

Economic regions of Azerbaijan